Randolph County is a county located in the U.S. state of Illinois. According to the 2020 census, it had a population of 30,163. Its county seat is Chester.

Owing to its role in the state's history, the county motto is "Where Illinois Began."  It contains the historically important village of Kaskaskia, Illinois's first capital.

The county is part of Southern Illinois in the southern portion of the state known locally as "Little Egypt", and includes fertile river flats, part of the American Bottom; it is near the Greater St. Louis area.

History
Randolph County was organized in 1795 out of a part of St. Clair County. It was named in honor of Edmund Randolph, Governor of Virginia. George Rogers Clark of the army of Virginia captured the area from the British on July 4, 1778, near the end of the Revolutionary War. The area then became the seat, for several years, of Illinois County, Virginia, although the Congress of the Confederation legislated the existence of the Northwest Territory on July 13, 1787.  Edmund Randolph was Governor of Virginia at the time Virginia ceded the Northwest Territory to the United States.  In 1809, when Illinois became a separate territory, Territorial Secretary Nathaniel Pope, in his capacity as acting governor, issued a proclamation establishing Randolph as one of the Illinois' two original counties.  The county's boundaries were last changed in 1827, when land was taken to form Perry County.

The Mississippi River has played a prominent role in the county's history, altering its boundaries in 1881 when it severed the isthmus that connected Kaskaskia to the Illinois mainland, destroying the original village of Kaskaskia and forcing its historic cemetery to be relocated across the river to Fort Kaskaskia.  Crains Island , southeast of Chester, is another enclave of Illinois west of the Mississippi that was created by a change in the river's course.

Geography

The Kaskaskia River flows into the Mississippi River in Randolph County. At this point the Mississippi, which usually defines the border between Illinois and Missouri, is entirely in Illinois. The Mississippi changed its course in the late-nineteenth century, leaving Kaskaskia, the former state capital, on the west side of the river. The boundary of the State, however, follows the old course of the river, leaving Illinois with an exclave on the western shore of the Mississippi River.  A smaller enclave, Crains Island, is a few miles further down the river.

Climate and weather

Major highways

  Illinois Route 3
  Illinois Route 4
  Illinois Route 13
  Illinois Route 150
  Illinois Route 153
  Illinois Route 154
  Illinois Route 155
  Illinois Route 159

Adjacent counties
 Monroe County (northwest)
 St. Clair County (north)
 Washington County (northeast)
 Perry County (east)
 Jackson County (southeast)
 Perry County, Missouri (south)
 Ste. Genevieve County, Missouri (southwest)

Randolph County is among the few counties in the United States to border two counties with the same name (Perry County in Missouri and Illinois).

Demographics

As of the 2010 United States Census, there were 33,476 people, 12,314 households, and 8,188 families residing in the county. The racial makeup of the county was 87.6% white, 9.7% black or African American, 0.3% Asian, 0.2% American Indian, 1.2% from other races, and 0.9% from two or more races. Those of Hispanic or Latino origin made up 2.6% of the population. In terms of ancestry, 40.3% were German, 11.3% were Irish, 9.4% were English, and 5.7% were American.

Of the 12,314 households, 29.1% had children under the age of 18 living with them, 52.0% were married couples living together, 10.1% had a female householder with no husband present, 33.5% were non-families, and 28.9% of all households were made up of individuals. The average household size was 2.37 and the average family size was 2.90. The median age was 41.0 years.

The median income for a household in the county was $45,020 and the median income for a family was $55,113. Males had a median income of $43,359 versus $28,376 for females. The per capita income for the county was $19,950. About 7.0% of families and 10.4% of the population were below the poverty line, including 11.9% of those under age 18 and 9.9% of those age 65 or over.

Government and infrastructure
The Illinois Department of Corrections Menard Correctional Center is located in Chester. Prior to the January 11, 2003 commutation of death row sentences, male death row inmates were housed in Menard, Tamms, and Pontiac correctional centers. After that date, only Pontiac continued to host the male death row.

Politics
Randolph is a rural conservative county in southern Illinois that has trended Republican since 2000 in presidential elections.

Media
There are two AM radio stations licensed in the county — WHCO 1230AM in Sparta and KSGM 980AM in Chester.

Weekly newspapers in the county are The Randolph County Herald Tribune located in Chester, The County Journal, which is based in Percy and also covers Perry and Jackson Counties, the North County News in Red Bud, and the Sparta News-Plaindealer.

The area is also served by the on-line newspaper based in Chester which is SunTimesNews.com

Communities

Cities
 Chester
 Red Bud
 Sparta

Villages

 Baldwin
 Coulterville
 Ellis Grove
 Evansville
 Kaskaskia
 Percy
 Prairie du Rocher
 Rockwood
 Ruma
 Steeleville
 Tilden

Unincorporated communities

 Blair
 Bremen
 Dozaville
 Eden
 Fort Gage
 Grigg
 Houston
 Leanderville
 Marigold
 Menard
 Modoc
 New Palestine
 Prairie
 Preston
 Reily Lake
 Schuline
 Shiloh Hill
 Walsh
 Welge
 Wine Hill

Forts

 Fort de Chartres

See also
 National Register of Historic Places listings in Randolph County, Illinois

References

External links
 KBDZ 93.1 FM Radio
 KSGM AM 980 Radio
 Randolph County Government
 SunTimesNews.com
 Randolph County Herald-Tribune
 North County News
 Sparta News-Plaindealer

 
1795 establishments in the Northwest Territory
Illinois counties
Illinois counties on the Mississippi River
Southern Illinois
Populated places established in 1795